Langden Brook is a watercourse in the Trough of Bowland, Lancashire, England.

Walks
A  hike follows the Langden Brook valley.

References

External links

Langden Brook
Langden Brook
Langden Brook